Shepardsville is an unincorporated census-designated place in northeastern Fayette Township, Vigo County, in the U.S. state of Indiana.  It lies along Trinity Ave. north of the city of Terre Haute, the county seat of Vigo County.  Its elevation is 502 feet (153 m), and it is located at  (39.6008700, -87.4175194).  Although Shepardsville is unincorporated, it has a post office, with the ZIP code of 47880.

The community is part of the Terre Haute metropolitan area.

Demographics

History
Shepardsville was founded in 1920. The post office at Shepardsville has been in operation since 1937.

Fire Protection
Fire protection for the town of Shepardsville is handled by the Shepardsville Fire Department.  est 1957

References

Census-designated places in Vigo County, Indiana
Census-designated places in Indiana
Terre Haute metropolitan area